Pagalil Oru Iravu (also spelled Pakalil Oru Iravu) is a 1979 Indian Tamil-language film directed by I. V. Sasi, starring Vijayakumar, Sridevi, Seema and Ravikumar. It is a remake of Sasi's own Malayalam film Aalinganam (1976), also starring Sridevi. The film was released on 15 August 1979.

Plot 
Rajee, a doctor, has a love interest in her cousin, Vinod, but, unfortunately for, Vinod loves Bindhu, a shy and down-to-earth girl. Rajee sacrifices her love and so, Vinod marries Bindhu. Bindhu's mother hides some truth about Bindhu to others. Everything goes well for Bindhu and she becomes pregnant but she falls down the stairs and has a miscarriage. Following this, she experiences frightening dreams and she is diagnosed to be suffering from retrograde hysteria. Ramesh, brother of Rajee, who returns from abroad, is shocked to see Bindhu and he recollects the past. Once during the adolescent days, Bindhu encounters Ramesh while targeting mangoes. Injured and unconscious, Ramesh is given first aid by Bindhu by tearing a piece of her short gown. Ramesh is attracted to her and unknowingly, Bindhu loses her virginity to Ramesh. Not knowing whom he was, she gets pregnant. Her mother takes her to a hill-side village to obtain an abortion by native treatment, due to which she loses memory of her adolescent age.

Bindhu, who is being treated for hysteria, frequently returns to a hysteric state more often. In the desire to know about her past, Major Sundarrajan compels her mother to reveal the truth. He informs Rajee about her past and she cures Bindhu. A few days later, Vinod takes Bindhu to a hill resort to bring about a change in her. There, Bindhu witnesses the women who aborted her, gets hysterical and becomes unconscious. Vinod learns the truth and he disowns her. After she recovers, she returns, but Vinod isn't ready to accept her as he feels that she has cheated him by hiding the truth. But Ramesh admits that he was the culprit behind her condition and commits suicide. Finally, Vinod understands the truth and accepts Bindhu as his wife.

Cast 
Vijayakumar as Vinod
Sridevi as Bindhu
Ravikumar as Ramesh
Seema as Rajee
Major Sundarrajan
V. K. Ramasamy
Suruli Rajan
Pushpalatha

Soundtrack 
The music was composed by Ilaiyaraaja, and the lyrics were written by Kannadasan. Vipin Nair of The Hindu said the film "had a fine soundtrack from Ilayaraja penned by Kannadasan", and was particularly appreciative of "Ilamai Enum Poongaatru". The song was later re-used in Pagadi Aattam (2017).

Reception 
Kalki appreciated the film for its innovative storyline, visuals, songs, cast performances and Sasi's direction.

References

External links 
 

1970s Tamil-language films
1979 films
Films directed by I. V. Sasi
Films with screenplays by Mahendran (filmmaker)
Films scored by Ilaiyaraaja
Tamil remakes of Malayalam films